Nieuwe Niedorp (West Frisian: Naaie Nierup) is a village in the Dutch province of North Holland.

History 
The village was first mentioned in 1289 as Niewenniedorp, and means "new new village". The extra Nieuwe (new) was added to distinguish from Oude Niedorp. Nieuwe Niedorp developed in the Middle Ages as a peat excavation area.

The Catholic Our Lady of Immaculate Conception Church was built between 1905 and 1906 as part of a U-shaped Franciscan monastery. The Dutch Reformed Fenix church from 1966, has a leaning church tower.

Nieuwe Niedorp was home to 534 people in 1840. It was a separate municipality until 1970, when it merged with Oude Niedorp and Winkel. In 2012, it became part of the municipality of Hollands Kroon.

Notable people 
 Dirck Pietersz van Nierop 1540-1610
 Dirck Rembrantsz van Nierop 1610-1682
 Pieter Rembrantsz van Nierop 1640-1708
 Elisabeth van der Woude 1657-1698

Gallery

See also
 Zeeuws spek

References

Former municipalities of North Holland
Populated places in North Holland
Hollands Kroon